Magilus is a genus of sea snails, marine gastropod mollusks in the family Muricidae, the murex snails or rock snails.

This genus was brought by Michel (1988) into the separate family Magilidae together with Latiaxis

Species
Species within the genus Magilus include:
 Magilus antiquus Montfort, 1810
 Magilus lankae Deraniyagala, 1968
 Magilus latens Bozzetti, 2011
 Magilus sowerbyi Massin, 1982
Species brought into synonymy 
 Magilus antiquatus Linnaeus: synonym of Magilus antiquus Montfort, 1810
 Magilus costatus G. B. Sowerby II, 1872: synonym of Magilus sowerbyi Massin, 1982 (invalid: junior homonym of Magilus costatus Chenu, 1843; M. sowerbyi is a replacement name)
 Magilus cumingii (H. Adams & A. Adams, 1864): synonym of Coralliophila cumingii (H. Adams & A. Adams, 1864)
 Magilus djedah Chenu, 1843: synonym of Leptoconchus djedah (Chenu, 1843) (original combination)
 Magilus ellipticus G. B. Sowerby I, 1823: synonym of Leptoconchus ellipticus (G. B. Sowerby I, 1823) (original combination)
 Magilus fimbriatus A. Adams, 1852: synonym of Coralliophila fimbriata (A. Adams, 1852)
 Magilus globulosus Sowerby, G.B. III, 1872  : synonym of Magilus antiquus Montfort, 1810
 Magilus japonicus Deraniyagala, 1968: synonym of Magilus antiquus japonicus Deraniyagala, 1968 (original rank)
 Magilus lamarckii (Deshayes, 1863) : synonym of Leptoconchus lamarckii Deshayes, 1863
 Magilus macrocephalus G. B. Sowerby III, 1919: synonym of Magilus microcephalus G. B. Sowerby II, 1872: synonym of Magilus antiquus Montfort, 1810 (described in synonymy)
 Magilus microcephalus Sowerby, G.B. III, 1872: synonym of Magilus antiquus
 Magilus peronii Lamarck, J.B.P.A. de, 1818: synonym of Magilus antiquus
 Magilus serratus Sowerby, G.B. III, 1872: synonym of Magilus antiquus
 Magilus solidiusculus G. B. Sowerby II, 1872: synonym of Leptoconchus solidiusculus (G. B. Sowerby II, 1872) (original combination)
 Magilus striatus (Rüppell, 1835): synonym of Leptoconchus striatus Rüppell, 1835
 Magilus tenuis Chenu, 1843: synonym of Leptoconchus tenuis (Chenu, 1843) (original combination)

References

 Vaught, K.C. (1989). A classification of the living Mollusca. American Malacologists: Melbourne, FL (USA). . XII, 195 pp

External links
 Montfort P. [Denys de. (1808-1810). Conchyliologie systématique et classification méthodique des coquilles. Paris: Schoell. Vol. 1: pp. lxxxvii + 409 [1808]. Vol. 2: pp. 676 + 16]
 Guettard J.E. (1770). Mémoires sur différentes parties des Sciences et Arts [qui referme ... Deuxième Mémoire, qui renferme la concordance des auteurs qui ont parlé des tuyaux marins fossiles, auxquels on a comparé ceux qui se pêchent actuellement dans la mer. Classe des Tuyaux Marins. Troisième Mémoire. Sur les erreurs où l'on a été au sujet des tuyaux marins. Paris, Prault. 3(544): 71]
 Neave, Sheffield Airey. (1939-1996). Nomenclator Zoologicus vol. 1-10 Online

 
Gastropod genera